The 1896 United States presidential election in Virginia took place on November 3, 1896, as part of the 1896 United States presidential election. Voters chose 12 representatives, or electors to the Electoral College, who voted for president and vice president.

Virginia voted for the Democratic and Populist candidate, former U.S. Representative William J. Bryan over the Republican candidate, Ohio Governor William McKinley. Bryan won the state by a margin of 6.56%.

Results

Results by county

References

Virginia
1896
1896 Virginia elections